Sadegh Nojouki (born February 11, 1950, in Tehran) is a famous Iranian musician, composer, arranger, and pianist of Persian classical and pop music. He is credited for the use of string orchestra and piano for first time in Iranian pop music. He currently resides in Los Angeles, United States.

He composed and arranged many songs for popular Iranian pop singers including Hayedeh, Sattar, Homeyra, Mahasti, Moein, Dariush, Omid, Martik, Vigen, Ebi, Shohreh, Leyla Forouhar, Googoosh, Morteza, etc.

References 

 Sadegh Nojouki
 Sadegh Nojouki's Compositions

1950 births
Living people
Iranian composers
Iranian songwriters
People from Tehran
Iranian emigrants to the United States
Iranian music arrangers